Ambitious Dragon is a New Zealand-bred, Hong Kong based Thoroughbred racehorse. In a racing career which began in 2010 he has won eleven races at Sha Tin Racecourse including the Hong Kong Mile, Hong Kong Classic Cup, Hong Kong Derby, Queen Elizabeth II Cup, Hong Kong Stewards' Cup and the Hong Kong Gold Cup. Ambitious Dragon was voted Hong Kong Horse of the Year for the 2010-2011 and 2011–2012 seasons.

References

 The Hong Kong Jockey Club – Ambitious Dragon Racing Record
 The Hong Kong Jockey Club

Racehorses trained in Hong Kong
Hong Kong racehorses
2006 racehorse births
Thoroughbred family 22-b
Racehorses bred in New Zealand